Even Østensen (born 2 June 1993) is a Norwegian footballer who plays as a forward for Staal Jørpeland.

Career
On 2 August 2018, Østensen signed a six month contract with Viking. He signed a contract extension after the 2018 season. After the 2020 season, his contract expired and he left the club.

In January 2021, Østensen announced his retirement from football, however one month later he returned to his former club Staal Jørpeland. On 25 July 2021, he scored a brace against his former club Viking in the first round of the 2021–22 Norwegian Cup, but Staal Jørpeland still lost 3–2.

Career statistics

Honours
Viking
 1. divisjon: 2018
 Norwegian Football Cup: 2019

References

1993 births
Living people
People from Hjelmeland
Norwegian footballers
Staal Jørpeland IL players
Viking FK players
Norwegian Third Division players
Norwegian Second Division players
Norwegian First Division players
Eliteserien players
Association football forwards
Sportspeople from Rogaland